Commesso may refer to:

 Commesso, Florentine mosaic, is a method of piecing together cut sections of luminous, narrow gemstones to form works of art
 Cheryl Ann Commesso, a disappeared person, found dead in 1995 in Pinellas County, Florida
 Salvatore Commesso (born 1975), Italian professional road bicycle racer

See also 
 Commisso